This is a list of cities and towns in Armenia ordered by population by the Statistical Committee of Armenia (ArmStat). Armenia has 46 municipalities designated as urban communities ( k’aghak’ayin hamaynk’ner) as of 2017. However, a city/town (քաղաք, k’aghak’ ) in Armenia is not defined based on the size of its population. The other 457 municipalities in Armenia are considered rural communities (գյուղական համայնքներ, gyughakan hamaynk’ner). Two-thirds of the population are now urbanized. Statistically, 63.6% of Armenians live in urban areas as compared to 36.4% in rural, as of 2017.

Yerevan, Gyumri, and Vanadzor are the three largest urban settlements of the republic, currently having populations of more than 50,000. They were considered as "cities of republican subordination" (հանրապետական ենթակայության քաղաքներ) during the Soviet period. The rest of the towns have populations less than 50,000.

Agarak, Dastakert and Shamlugh were downgraded from towns to villages as a result of the administrative reforms took place during 2017. As such they are no longer included in the list below.

List  

Source: 2001 census; 2011 census; 2020 estimate

See also
 List of cities and towns in Artsakh

References 
Notes

Citations 

 
 
Cities
Armenia
Armenia
Armenia
Armenia